This is a list of speakers of the Althing, the Icelandic parliament.

The Speaker of the Althing (literally the President of the Althing) is the presiding officer (speaker) of that legislature.

Speakers of the United Althing (1875-1991)

Speakers of the unicameral Althing (1991-)

References

Main
Althing
Iceland